Gaius Atilius Serranus (c. 149 – 87 BC) was a Roman senator, who served as consul in 106 BC as the colleague of Quintus Servilius Caepio.

Career
Although noted by Cicero as being a "a most stupid man", he managed to defeat Quintus Lutatius Catulus in the consular elections of the previous year. Before this, Serranus had presumably held the office of praetor by 109 BC, a necessary requirement in the senatorial career track.

Serranus was one of the senators of consular rank who took up arms against the tribune Saturninus in 100 BC. He is probably the Atilius Serranus who was murdered on orders of Gaius Marius following the conclusion of the civil war in 87 BC.

Family 
Serranus may have been the father or more likely grandfather of Atilia the wife of Cato the Younger.

See also 
 List of Roman consuls

References

Sources
 
 

2nd-century BC births
Year of birth uncertain
87 BC deaths
2nd-century BC Roman consuls
1st-century BC Romans
Serranus, Gaius